Åndalsnes Station is a railway station in the town of Åndalsnes, the administrative centre of Rauma Municipality in Møre og Romsdal county, Norway. It has been the terminal station of the Rauma Line since the line was extended to Åndalsnes on 30 November 1924. The station was designed by Gudmund Hoel and is located on reclaimed land along the Isfjorden. To get the line to the station, a cutting had to be built. In addition to a station building, the station has an engine shed and a bus station; the station building is next to a cruise ship port. It serves four passenger trains per day, and has correspondence by bus onwards to the nearby towns of Molde and Ålesund. The station is staffed and features a chapel within a retired train carriage.

History

The area where the station is located is built on reclaimed land, as the Åndalsnes side of Isfjorden is sufficiently shallow. The earthwork for the reclaiming was taken from a cutting built to allow the line access to Åndalsnes. The earthwork was transported using temporary  gauge railways. In 1912, tests were done in the area of the cutting to establish if it should be a cutting or a tunnel. It was necessary to move one house to make room for the line through Åndalsnes. It cost  to build. Both the main station building and the auxiliary buildings were designed by Gudmund Hoel of NSB Arkitektkontor, the in-house architecture firm for the Norwegian State Railways, who were responsible for construction.

The station also received an engine shed in natural stone brick. Built from mid to late 1924, it cost . The classic style brick buildings on the station stuck out from the other station buildings on the Rauma Line.  To secure a sufficient water supply for the steam locomotives, a new water pool needed to be built at Bjørmosen. By damming up a pool, it was possible to supply  of water per day to the station. This was built by NSB, but was then given free of charge to the municipality who operated it, in exchange for the railway receiving the allocated amount of water free for all eternity. Because of delayed delivery of parts from Germany, the water system was not opened until 10 February 1925. On 29 November 1924, Norsk Spisevognselskap established a restaurant in the station. As one of the larger railway station restaurants in the country, it included an outdoor patio. Åndalsnes Station was opened on 30 November 1924, when the Rauma Line was extended from Verma Station.

The train chapel was opened on 10 June 2003. On 8 June 2011, a renovation project for the station was completed. This included better transfer between trains and buses and cruise ships, a new park, and raising of the platforms. Including upgrades to the track, the upgrades cost . The station building has received an elevator and a renovation of the lobby. The station is considered worthy of preservation and the renovation was done in cooperation with the preservation authorities.

Facilities

The station building is owned by Rom Eiendom, a subsidiary of NSB, while the infrastructure is owned by the Norwegian National Rail Administration. Åndalsnes Station has a staffed ticket booth and has a waiting room, lockers, a kiosk, a bicycle rack and parking for 15 cars. It is located next to the cruise ship terminal. The part of the station building not used for train operations is rented out to businesses. At the station is a train chapel, a retired B3 carriage which has been converted to a chapel. It has kept the original seating of the train, but there is incorporated an altar. It is run as a cooperation between the Church of Norway, the Salvation Army and the Pentecostal Church.

Service
SJ Norge operates passenger train services on the line. Using Class 93 trains, they operate four services in each direction per day. From the station, there is correspondence with buses to the nearby towns of Ålesund and Molde. During the summer, from June through August, NSB operates the trains as tourists trains, limiting the service from Åndalsnes to Bjorli.

References

Bibliography

Notes

Railway stations in Møre og Romsdal
Railway stations on the Rauma Line
Railway stations opened in 1924
1924 establishments in Norway
Rauma, Norway